The Caspian gudgeon (Gobio holurus) is a freshwater fish species in the family Cyprinidae. It is a small fish, less than 10 cm, which is distributed in the drainages of the Western Caspian Sea basin (Kuma, Terek and Sulak river  drainages) in Russia and adjacent countries. It is widespread and not threatened, but there is no information about its biology.

References

holurus
Fish described in 1976